Glukhovo is a rural locality (a selo) in Kurilovskoye Rural Settlement, Sobinsky District, Vladimir Oblast, Russia. The population was 181 as of 2010. There are 4 streets.

Geography 
Glukhovo is located on the Vorsha River, 32 km northwest of Sobinka (the district's administrative centre) by road. Morozovo is the nearest rural locality.

References 

Rural localities in Sobinsky District